Western Australian Government Railways (WAGR) was the operator of railway services in the state of Western Australia between October 1890 and June 2003. Owned by the state government, it was renamed a number of times to reflect extra responsibility for tram and ferry operations that it assumed and later relinquished. Westrail was the trading name of WAGR from September 1975 until December 2000, when the WAGR's freight division and the Westrail name and logo were privatised. Its freight operations were privatised in December 2000 with the remaining passenger operations transferred to the Public Transport Authority in July 2003.

History of operations

The WAGR had its origins in 1879, when the Department of Works & Railways was established.

The first WAGR line opened on 26 July 1879 between Geraldton and Northampton. It was followed by the Eastern Railway from Fremantle to Guildford via Perth on 1 March 1881.

Over the next few decades, an extensive network of main lines and branches throughout Western Australia would be built, primarily to service the wheatbelt. Prior to the expanded use of road transport, the network was of vital importance in the state, particularly for the moving of agricultural, forestry and mining products.

In 1890, the Department was abolished and replaced by the WAGR and the Department of Works & Buildings (later the Public Works Department).

Legislative restrictions were implemented to limit competition from road transport, most notably from the 1930s through to the 1950s, when the Transport Co-ordination Board kept strict control over commercial road traffic through powers vested by the State Transport Co-ordination Act 1933. As road transportation expanded and losses escalated, many lines closed from 1949.

The network peaked in 1937 at 6,600 kilometres. Unusually for such a large network, only one tunnel was required, the Swan View Tunnel. A few isolated lines were operated, such as the Marble Bar line in the Pilbara and the Hopetoun-Ravensthorpe line on the South Coast. With many lines in need of heavy maintenance, rolling stock in need of replacement and heavy losses being incurred, during the 1950s many branches closed with 1,320 kilometres of the network so treated in 1956/57, although 275 kilometres were subsequently reopened on a seasonal basis.

In the late 1960s, the Eastern and Eastern Goldfields lines between Perth and Kalgoorlie was gauge converted to allow through operation of trains from the eastern states along with the Esperance & Menzies lines, with sections through the Avon River and east of Southern Cross built on new alignments. A concerted program of dieselisation saw diesel locomotives replace the last steam locomotives in March 1972.

In the late 20th century, the end of restrictions on competing road transport resulted in the WAGR and its successors moving from being a small customer-oriented system to a predominantly main line bulk carrier operation. This resulted in many smaller communities losing their facilities. However, in the wheatbelt, bulk handling of grain continued despite the changes.

Westrail
In September 1975, the WAGR adopted the trading name Westrail and an associated logo. However, the official name of the WAGR was not changed.

The new name was the main element of a complete program to improve the WAGR's public image. Every visible feature of the organisation was to be associated with the new Westrail identity. The transition from WAGR to Westrail quickly began, with the new name rapidly and almost universally replacing the old one in the vocabulary of staff and the public.

Strong impetus to acceptance of the new corporate identity was given by the completion of a new Westrail office headquarters and passenger facility at East Perth Terminal (then known as Perth Terminal). The new building, named the Westrail Centre, was opened by the  Premier of Western Australia, Sir Charles Court, on 12 November 1976.

Westrail was responsible for managing the state's rail infrastructure. It operated urban and regional passenger and freight services throughout Western Australia. In Perth, Westrail provided the metropolitan area rail service, under contract to another arm of the State government. Its country passenger services involved the operation of both trains and road coaches.

In October 1987, it was announced by Premier Brian Burke and Federal Minister for Land Transport & Infrastructure Support, Peter Duncan, that a merger of Westrail with Australian National was being investigated. Nothing ever came of it.

On 17 December 2000, the WAGR's freight division along with the Westrail name and logo were sold to Australia Western Railroad, a subsidiary of the Australian Railroad Group (ARG). The deal also saw the WAGR's freight lines leased to ARG for 99 years.

The WAGR's remaining functions, including owning the rail network and operating regional passenger services, were transferred to the Western Australian Government Railways Commission. On 1 January 2003, the WAGR Commission's functions were absorbed by the Public Transport Authority.

The former Westrail Centre is now known as the Public Transport Centre.

Names
The WAGR was renamed a number of times to reflect extra responsibility for tram and ferry operations that it assumed and later relinquished.
1 January 1880 – 30 September 1890: Department of Works & Railways
1 October 1890 – 30 June 1914: Western Australian Government Railways (I)
1 July 1914 – 30 June 1922: Western Australian Government Railways & Tramways
1 July 1922 – 30 June 1930: Western Australian Government Railways, Tramways & Electricity Supply
1 July 1930 – 30 June 1946: Western Australian Government Railways, Tramways, Ferries & Electricity Supply
1 July 1946 – 21 April 1949: Western Australian Government Railways, Tramways & Ferries
22 April 1949 – 16 December 2000: Western Australian Government Railways (II)
19 September 1975: WAGR adopted the trading name Westrail
17 December 2000: The freight business, Westrail name and a 49-year lease on the network outside of Perth were sold to the Australian Railroad Group. The public entity that continued to operate passenger services was renamed the Western Australian Government Railways Commission (WAGRC).
1 July 2003: WAGRC succeeded by Public Transport Authority that today operates services under the Transperth and Transwa brands

Corporate identity
Initially, Westrail applied an orange with blue stripe livery to its locomotives and passenger vehicles. Freight rolling stock and road trucks were painted yellow, and blue was used on all signs, buildings and printed material. The Westrail logo incorporated a stylised "W" surmounted by a solid bar representing a railway track. Between the bar and the "W" was the word "Westrail".

In July 1997, a yellow with blue livery was unveiled when the first Q class diesel-electric locomotive was delivered.

Inquiries and Royal Commissions
A range of committees of inquiry as well as Royal Commissions were conducted on aspects of the railways between 1893 and 1959, however to appreciate the number of commissions that had relevance to railway operations, the coal and wheat industries were linked with the railway operations as well. The following are only a selected group of commissions:

 Report of the Royal Commission appointed to inquire into the condition and organisation of the railway workshops at Fremantle.
Chairperson: Charles Harper.
 Royal Commission on City Railway Traffic 1899
Chairperson: H. W. Venn 30/06/1897
 Royal Commission appointed to inquire into the administration of the locomotive branch of the Western Australian Government Railways
Chairperson: Richard Speight 23/08/1899
 Royal Commission on charges made against high officials in the service of the Western Australian Government Railways 1906
Chairperson: Robert F. McMillan
 Royal Commission on railways 1922
Chairperson: George W. Stead
 Report of the Royal Commission appointed to inquire into Australian Standard Garratt Locomotive  1947
Chairperson: Albert A. Wolff
 Second interim report of the Royal Commission appointed to enquire into (inter-alia) the supply of local coal to the Western Australian government railways
Chairperson: Alexander J. Gibson
 First interim report of the Royal Commission appointed to inquire into the Midland Junction Workshops of the Western Australian Government Railways
Chairperson: Alexander J. Gibson
 Report of the Royal Commission appointed to inquire into the management, workings and control of the Western Australian Government Railways
Chairperson: Alexander J. Gibson
 Royal Commission appointed to inquire into administration of the Western Australian Government Railways
Report on the working of the government railways for quarter ended 30 September 1957
 Report of the Western Australian Government Railways Commission for the year ended 30 June 1959 
Chairperson: Alan G. Smith

Acquisitions
The WAGR purchased the Great Southern Railway in December 1896 and the Midland Railway of Western Australia in August 1964.

Services
The WAGR operated a wide variety of services throughout its history, including the more standard country and suburban passenger and freight workings as well as a limited electrified service, early country railcar services, road bus services and overnight sleeper services to distant destinations.

Named services

Although some passenger trains were bestowed nicknames, it wasn't until The Westland was launched in 1938, that a service was officially named. Further trains were named in the 1960s in an effort to increase the prestige of rail travel.

Unnamed services
The WAGR operated services from Perth to many destinations throughout the state. In 1935, it operated 63 sleeper services a week. It also operated local passenger, many operating as mixed trains. The last of these ceased in 1973.

Electrified services
While the current Perth urban passenger network operated by Transperth is entirely electrified, between May 1924 and March 1969 the State Electricity Commission operated the only electrified line in Western Australia as part of the WAGR network. The line was 800 metres in length and operated within the confines of the East Perth Power Station. The electric locomotive used on the railway is preserved at the Western Australian Rail Transport Museum in Bassendean, though is currently not on display.

Country diesel railcar services

In December 1937, the Governor class diesel railcars were introduced on daylight regional services from Perth. The longer distance services remained locomotive hauled.

Road bus service
Where lines were closed in the 1940s and 1950s, or passenger services discontinued, road bus services were introduced. Most of the services and the same routes continue to the present.

The rail-road services commenced on 24 November 1941 with one vehicle operating a service from Perth to Kojonup via Boddington. By 1949, there were 28 buses. and by 1959, more than fifty. Dual-purpose buses that also carried freight were introduced in 1949. Buses operated included Fodens, articulated trailer buses, AECs, Leyland Lions, Hino RC320Ps and Mercedes-Benz O303s.

In the late 1960s, long-distance coaches operated from Perth to Meekatharra, Esperance, Geraldton and Albany.

In the early 1970s the WAGR Bus service included seasonal six-day Wildflower Study Tours from Perth and along roads to and from Geraldton through the northern wheatbelt. These had first been operated in 1948 by the Midland Railway of Western Australia. Also in the early 1970s, the King Karri Scenicruiser buses ran from Bunbury through Manjimup, Pemberton, Northcliffe and Walpole to Albany at the same time the Albany Progress overnight train was still operating, making it possible to do a round trip by rail from Perth to Albany and bus from Albany to Perth via Bunbury.

In the mid-1970s some services reflected where rail services had either closed or had ceased providing facilities for passengers, the following selection is not the total service at the time.
Albany-Denmark-Nornalup-Walpole
Perth-Wooroloo-Wundowie-Northam
Perth-Toodyay-Goomalling-Wubin-Mount Magnet-Meekatharra
Wagin-Katanning-Pingrup-Jerramungup

Railway road truck services
There were also road-freight services, while the restrictions on non-government trucking were still in force, with suburban truck services from Perth to Midland, Fremantle, Kewdale and Gosnells. The country services were extensive having Perth and country rail stations as terminal locations.

Liveries

Until 1951, most steam locomotives were painted black. From that date, locomotives used on passenger services were painted green. The early diesel locomotives were painted green, with a red stripe later added. In the late 1960s, a grey and light blue livery was introduced. The latter was resurrected by South Spur Rail Services in the early 2000s.

Carriages were painted Indian red, before a larch green and cream livery was introduced in October 1951. When launched in 1964, The Midlander stock was painted in a maroon and ivory livery. When the Westrail brand was introduced in 1975, an orange and blue livery was introduced for locomotives. In the late 1990s, this was superseded by a yellow and blue livery.

Rolling stock

The WAGR operated a large number of unique steam, diesel and electric locomotive classes. Most of the steam locomotives were built in the United Kingdom, with the WAGR's Midland Railway Workshops building some from 1915. The early diesels were mainly built by Beyer, Peacock and Company in England, Clyde Engineering in Sydney, and English Electric in Brisbane. Later diesels were assembled in Perth.

The WAGR built much of its carriage and wagon stock at the Midland Railway Workshops. From the late 1930s, the WAGR operated diesel railcars such as the Governor and Wildflower classes.

In 1936, the WAGR owned 420 locomotives, 4 railcars, 461 carriages, 24 brake vans and 11.052 goods wagons.

Chief Mechanical Engineer

Chief Mechanical Engineer was the highest posting at the Midland Railway Workshops, which in turn managed (through construction, repair and design) all aspects of railway maintenance and equipment. The post was established in 1900 and abandoned in 1989.

Lines and operational centres
See Western Australian Government Railway lines and operations centres

Legacy and preservation
A number of former WAGR locomotives and rolling stock types, as well as many examples of WAGR architecture and railway infrastructure have been preserved, with the Hotham Valley Railway and Rail Heritage WA holding extensive collections. Some items are preserved interstate, notably by the Pichi Richi Railway. With the deregulation of the Australian rail market in the 1990s, former WAGR rolling stock has operated in other states, with L class locomotives having operated in the eastern states for ATN Access, Aurizon and Pacific National.

Publications
In September 1970, WAGR News Letter was launched as a staff newsletter. The last edition was published in December 1973, with Movement superseding it.

From 1975 until 1981, Westrail News Letter was published as a staff newsletter.

See also

Rail transport in Western Australia
Railway dams and reservoirs of Western Australia
Transperth
Transwa
Wheatbelt railway lines of Western Australia

References

Bibliography

WAGR Publicity Section, Perth. Pamphlets and information sheets produced in the early 1960s.

External links
Home Rail Heritage WA
WAGR goods wagons information
Brief History
Network map
AU WA A585 - Western Australian Government Railways [2] Westrail key document

 
Defunct government agencies of Western Australia
Former government railways of Australia
Railways
Railway companies established in 1890
Railway companies disestablished in 2003
1890 establishments in Australia
2003 disestablishments in Australia